Plichon is a French surname. It may refer to:

 Charles Ignace Plichon (1814–88), French lawyer, businessman and politician
 Jean Plichon (1863–1936), French industrialist and politician
 Jean-Pierre Plichon (1907–66), French engineer and politician